Gunther Josef Goldman (16 June 1924 – 10 July 2007) was a German-born South African cricket umpire. He stood in two Test matches between 1967 and 1970. He umpired 21 first-class cricket matches between 1961 and 1973, all of them at the Newlands ground in Cape Town.

Goldman applied to become a naturalized U.S. resident in January 1983, at which point he was living in San Antonio, Texas. He died there on 10 July 2007, at the age of 83.

See also
 List of Test cricket umpires

References

1924 births
2007 deaths
German emigrants to South Africa
Sportspeople from Hamburg
South African emigrants to the United States
South African Test cricket umpires